Upside is a 2010 American dramatic film written and directed by Ken Horstmann and starring Randall Bentley. It is set in Atlanta, Georgia.

Plot
High school senior Solomon White pretty much has his future as a college lacrosse player laid out for him till a concussion has him seeing everything upside-down. Not knowing how long this condition will take to right itself, Solomon meets lecturer Wren Woods at a support group for the visually impaired (mostly all blind, as is she). With future plans at least on hold, he begins hanging out with her, who - along with Mrs. Buck (Solomon's English teacher) and Prof. Craig Parker (a writing mentor Mrs. Buck arranged for Solomon) - guides Solomon into becoming a man who can make decisions for himself and into considering accepting Christ in his life.

Production
The lacrosse scenes in the film were staged by Richie Meade, head coach for the United States Naval Academy.

Solomon Olds and Jacob Olds from Family Force 5 appear in the film dancing in the scene that features their song, along with Solomon's wife Lauren.

According to the closing credits the film was shot all on location in seven cities in and around Atlanta.

Music
Upside features an original score by Christian Wood.

The soundtrack includes songs by Family Force 5, Drew Holcomb and The Neighbors, and Sony Music Nashville artist Corey Crowder.

 Songs by Family Force 5
 "Radiator"

 Songs by Corey Crowder
 "Small Town"
 "Higher Ground"
 "What Was And Might Have Been"
 "Here's Looking At You Kid"
 "When My Ship Comes In"
 "The Last Ones Standing"

 Songs by Drew Holcomb and The Neighbors
 "The Wire"
 "Fire and Dynamite"

 Songs by Drew Holcomb
 "I Like To Be With Me When I'm With You"

 Songs by Johanna Horstmann
 "Even In My Darkness"

Reception

 The film received the Dove Family Seal of Approval from The Dove Foundation. "This is an enjoyable film for the family, especially the teens in the house."
 "Upside is a unique, entertaining, inspiring movie... a clever metaphor for the human condition." -Ted Baehr | Movieguide
 "Upside is an inspiring film about faith and love that challenges us all to follow the unique path God has for us." - Mark Hall of Casting Crowns

Accolades

Awards won
 2010 Redemptive Storyteller Award by the Redemptive Film Festival (held at Regent University)

Nominations
 2010 Transforming Stories International Christian Film Festival Semi-Finalist.

References

External links
 
 
 Movie Events Info

2010 films
2010 drama films
Films about evangelicalism
American drama films
2010s English-language films
2010s American films